Al-Ameen Educational Society was started in the year 1966 to meet the needs of education in the city of Bangalore and of the minority Muslim community. Mumtaz Ahmed Khan is the founder of al-Ameen Educational Society. Number of social workers supported him to start and establish around 20 branches of Al-Ameen Educational Society and 200 institutions throughout India.

History
Mumtaz Ahmed Khan is the founder of Al-Ameen Educational Society. At the age of 31, in 1966 Khan founded the Al-Ameen Movement. He had decided to name it The Bangalore Educational Society. He was advised against this by his friend Khader Hussein who suggested Al-Ameen Educational Society as a reference to the title given to Prophet Muhammad which meant The Trustworthy. Hussein later became the principle of Saboo Siddiq Polytechnic, Bombay.
Abbasiya Begum, a female member of the Karnataka Legislative Council was elected the first chairperson of this society.

A number of social workers supported him for starting and establishing around 20 branches of Al-Ameen Educational Society and 200 institutions throughout India.

Structure

Activities
Planning Commission of India member Syeda Saiyidain Hameed was awarded Al-Ameen All India Community Leadership Award - 2006 by the Secretary, Chairman and Vice Chairman on 23 January 2007.

Institutions

Al-Ameen College of Pharmacy
Al-Ameen College of Law
Al-Ameen Arts, Science and Commerce Degree College
Al-Ameen College of Education
Al-Ameen Institute of Management Studies
Al-Ameen Institute of Information Sciences
Al-Ameen Pre University College
Al-Ameen Primary & High School

References

External links
 Official website 

Educational organisations based in India
Minority schools
Schools in Bangalore